Anna Maria Joachim genannt Thalbach (born 1 June 1973), known as Anna Maria Thalbach, is a German actress. Her mother, Katharina Thalbach, is also an actress. Her daughter  is an actress as well. In 2002, she was in Alexander Pfeuffer's short film Breakfast?

Selected filmography

References

External links

 

1973 births
Living people
German television actresses
Actresses from Berlin
German film actresses
20th-century German actresses
21st-century German actresses